Charles Vildrac (November 22, 1882 – June 25, 1971), born "Charles Messager", was a French libertarian playwright, poet and author of what some consider the first modern children's novel, L'Île rose (1924).

Born in Paris, Vildrac's first poems were written when he was a teenager in the 1890s. In 1901 he published Le Verlibrisme, a defense of traditional verse. In 1912 he published a collection of prose poems.

He was a member of the Abbaye de Créteil which he founded with Georges Duhamel. He died in  Saint-Tropez.

The Prix de poésie Charles Vildrac is named for him.

Works
 Poèmes (1905)
 Images et mirages (1907), poems
 Livre d'amour (1910), poems
 Notes sur la technique poétique (1910), Notes on Poetic Technique, with Georges Duhamel
 Chants du désespéré (1914–20) (1920), Songs of a Desperate Man, poems
 Découverte (1912), récit novel
 Chants du désespéré (1920), poems
 Le Paquebot Tenacity (1920; lit. S.S. Tenacity), theatre play
 L'Indigent (1920), theatre play
 Michel Auclair (1921)
 L'Île rose (1924), children's novel, lit. The Pink Island, translated as Rose Island
 Poèmes de l'Abbaye (1925), poems
 Madame   Béliard (1925), theatre play
 Prolongement (1927), poems
 D’un voyage au Japon (1927), travel story
 La Brouille (1930), The Misunderstanding, theatre play
 La Colonie (1930), children's novel (sequel to L'Île rose)
 Les Lunettes du lion (1932), children's tale
 La famille Moineau (1932), children's tale
 Le Jardinier de Samos (1932), theatre play
 Milot (1933), children's tale
 Bridinette (1935), children's tale
 Poucette (1936), theatre play
 L'œuvre peinte d'Eugène Dabit (1937), monographie
 Russie neuve (1938), travel story
 L'Air du temps (1938), theatre play
 Trois mois de prison (1942)
 L'Honneur des poètes (1943]), volume of poems published by the French Resistance; Vildrac's contribution appears under the pseudonym Robert Barade
 Lazare (1945), in Chroniques de Minuit, Les Éditions de Minuit, p. 15-39
 Les Pères ennemis (1946), The Enemy Fathers, theatre play
 D'après l'écho (1949)
 Amadou le Bouquillon (1951), children's tale
 Les Jouets du Père Noël (1952), The Toys of Father Christmas
 Pages de journal (1968)

Notes and references

 France, Peter (Ed.) (1995). The New Oxford Companion to Literature in French. Oxford: Clarendon Press.  .

External links
 Poems by Charles Vildrac

1882 births
1971 deaths
French male poets
20th-century French poets
20th-century French male writers